Dimitri Alexander Christakis is an American pediatrician, researcher, and author from Seattle, Washington.

Education
Christakis received a Bachelor of Arts in English Literature from Yale University, a Doctor of Medicine (MD) from the University of Pennsylvania, and a Master of Public Health Degree from the University of Washington.

Career
Christakis is the George Adkins Professor at the University of Washington, Seattle, WA in the Department of Pediatrics. He was appointed Director of Center for Child Health, Behavior, and Development at Seattle Children's Hospital Research Institute in 2005, and he is a member of the American Academy of Pediatrics. In addition, he is an adjunct professor in the Departments of Health Services and Psychiatry at the University of Washington. 

Christakis and his colleagues have conducted research on the risk factors of early television exposure, detailing an increased risk for the onset of attention, health, and behavioral issues in adolescents. He is the co-author of The Elephant in the Living Room: Make Television Work for Your Kids ( 2006). His research also focused on how the language acquisition for children can be improved by playing blocks and how children are aggressive while watching violent cartoons at 7–10 years of age. As part of a popular TEDx talk, Christakis spoke regarding the newborn brain and media exposure on children. Christakis has been instrumental in the revision of national guidelines on pediatric screen exposure. And his research was also instrumental in calling into question the efficacy of "Baby Einstein" (and similar) videos; his group's research, published in the Journal of Pediatrics, found that "for every hour a child 8 to 16 months old watched educational videos, they understood six to eight fewer words than their peers."

During the COVID-19 pandemic, Christakis appeared frequently on public media to help advance the public understanding of science related to the situation faced by children, particularly with respect to the harms accruing to children from having to be masked or out of school. 

Christakis was appointed the editor-in-chief of the peer-reviewed journal JAMA Pediatrics in 2018.

Awards and honors 
In 2010, Christakis received the Research Award for Lifetime Contribution by the Academic Pediatric Association, and, in 2018, he was elected as Member of Washington State Academy of Sciences. 

His H-index is 93.

Selected publications

 Dimitri A. Christakis, Frederick J. Zimmerman, David L. DiGiuseppe and Carolyn A. McCarty. "Early Television Exposure and Subsequent Attentional Problems in Children". Journal of the American Academy of Pediatrics.
Dimitri A. Christakis, Loren Mell, Thomas D. Koepsell, Frederick J. Zimmerman and Frederick A. Connell. "Association of Lower Continuity of Care With Greater Risk of Emergency Department Use and Hospitalization in Children". Journal of the American Academy of Pediatrics.
Christakis D A, and Feudtner C. "Ethics in a short white coat: the ethical dilemmas that medical students confront". Journal of Academic Medicine.
Dimitri A Christakis. "The effects of infant media usage: what do we know and what should we learn?". Wiley Online Library.
Dimitri A. Christakis, Jill Gilkerson, and Jeffrey A. Richards. "Audible Television and Decreased Adult Words, Infant Vocalizations, and Conversational Turns A Population-Based Study". JAMA Network.

References

External links
 Seattle Children's Hospital

Year of birth missing (living people)
Living people
Perelman School of Medicine at the University of Pennsylvania alumni
University of Washington faculty
Physicians from Washington (state)
21st-century American physicians
Yale College alumni
University of Washington School of Public Health alumni
American pediatricians
Medical journal editors
Writers from Seattle